Chyna Layne is a Jamaican American actress who has appeared in a number of films and television productions, including the movie Precious, the television movie Life Support, and the television drama Push.

Career
Layne has appeared in over 30 independent films. She has also been featured on the cover of Fearless magazine.

Filmography

Film

Television

References

External links

Living people
21st-century American actresses
Actresses from New York (state)
American people of Jamaican descent
American film actresses
American television actresses
Year of birth missing (living people)